Auchenflower may refer to:
Auchenflower, Queensland, a suburb in the City of Brisbane, Australia
Auchenflower, Scotland